Abdullah Ahmed Al Asta (born 24 August 1986) is a Saudi Arabian professional footballer who plays as a left back.

References

1986 births
Living people
Saudi Arabian footballers
Al-Raed FC players
Al-Shabab FC (Riyadh) players
Al Nassr FC players
Saudi Professional League players
People from Buraidah
Association football fullbacks